Pao cai, also romanization as Pao tsai, also known as Chinese pickles, Chinese sauerkraut, or pickled cabbage, refers to fermented vegetables in Chinese, which typically use different vegetables (e.g. Chinese cabbage, cabbage, radish, mustard stems, long beans, peppers, daikon, carrots, and ginger) as raw materials. The different vegetables are then fermented in an anaerobic jar which contains a special pao cai brine. To improve the flavours and create antibacterial effects, garlic, ginger, chilli, onion and cloves can be added during the process of pickle fermentation. In Chinese, pao cai is particularly found in Sichuan cuisine. It is most commonly found in northern and western China; however, there is also a unique form of pao cai, called suan cai, which is prominent in Northeastern China. It is eaten with rice, often with congee during breakfast. There exists more than 11 types of pao cai in China.

Similar fermented vegetables can be found all over the world with various favors, and they are also referred to as pao cai in Chinese, such as the Sichuanese zha cai, Central American curtido, French cornichons, and the German sauerkraut.

History 

Vegetables have been a food resource for human survival since ancient times and in order to supply people with basic food needs, it was necessary to store some vegetables during the peak harvest season for consumption in the off-season. Therefore, the ancient Chinese used salt to preserve fresh vegetables by salting and pickling them in earthen jars. The vegetables pickled with salt are the prototype of pao cai, which is the most traditional biological fermented product in China and is a precious national heritage that continues to this day.

The earliest collection of poems in China, the Shijing, has records of pickled and processed vegetables, of which "葅” is today's pao cai. In the following Zhou Dynasty, Northern Wei Dynasty, Tang Dynasty, Song Dynasty, Yuan Dynasty and Ming Dynasty, there are historical records and books about pao cai.

The development of pao cai into the Qing Dynasty (1644-1911) is well documented with a rich variety of pao cai, including Sichuan pao cai. During the Qing Dynasty, pao cai was also used as a dowry by the folk in southern and northern Sichuan, and the custom remains in some parts of Sichuan to this day, demonstrating the importance of pao cai in people's lives since ancient times.

In the history of the development of pao cai in China, Sichuan paocai has been widely recorded, whether it is the climate and soil suitable for growing raw vegetables for pao cai, the technology of pao cai production, the fermentation containers of  pao cai(i.e. pao cai jar), the popularity of pao cai or the status in the pao cai industry.

Common forms of pao cai

Sichuan pao cai 

The Sichuan pao cai (Chinese: 四川泡菜), also known as Sichuan pickles, is a typical representative of Chinese fermented vegetables primarily produced and consumed in southwestern China and its making history can be traced back to Shang Dynasty. Sichuan pao cai has been playing a crucial role in Sichuan cuisine for over three thousand years. It is widely used as side dishes, appetizers, and condiments because of its crisp texture, special fragrance, and health benefits originating from its lactic acid fermentation. Sichuan pao cai is produced both domestically in locals' daily life and commercially in industry, and it is popular throughout China.

Production 
The Sichuan pao cai is commonly made from fresh or salted vegetables like radish, carrot, and cowpea with anaerobic fermentation under ambient temperature based on the microbes present on the raw materials. The microbes are mainly lactic acid bacteria (LAB) which grows preferentially under the fermentation conditions. The raw materials are immersed in brine (a 6–8% salt concentration) seasoned by dressings like ginger, chili, Sichuan pepper, and garlic. Local people in Sichuan utilize aged pao cai brine for fermentation. If the aged brine is not spoilage or has no inappropriate odor, it is often reused for many years or even decades. The aged Sichuan pao cai brine can provide great amounts of lactic acid bacteria, which helps it to grow rapidly and become the dominant microorganisms.

The production of homemade Sichuan pao cai utilizes specially designed jars. The top of the jar is surrounded by an eave-like circle notch and the lid is upside down like a bowl at the top of the jar. The notch is filled with water to seal the jar and create an anaerobic environment for lactic acid bacteria. The gas produced by microbes during the process of fermentation inside the jar can escape the jar through dissolving in the water. Many local families in Sichuan have pao cai jars at home.

In industrial production, Sichuan pao cai is classified into three categories: fermented pickles, instant pickles, and other pickles. Fermented pickles are firstly soaked in salted water for fermentation and then add bittern or solution in it. The solid materials are less than 50% and will not separate from the liquid. Instant pickles will also be soaked in salted water in the first place. Then they are reshaped, desalted, dressed, packaged, and sterilized on the assembly line. The other pickles will choose many other materials like mushrooms, legumes, seaweed besides the traditional ingredients.

Pao cai industry in Sichuan 
China's pao cai industry has grown rapidly in recent years, with a market size of more than 40 billion yuan, pao cai enterprises are mainly concentrated in the Sichuan region, the output value of Sichuan pao cai reached 33 billion yuan in 2018, accounting for 70.21% of the national total output value, of which Meishan's output value of up to 16 billion yuan, accounting for 48.48% of the output value of Sichuan pao cai.

With the rapid growth of the industry scale, the accompanying environmental pollution problems have been intensified, especially the discharge of high salinity wastewater, which will deteriorate water quality, affect the growth and reproduction of aquatic organisms, especially fish, and cause groundwater pollution and soil salinization. In turn, these affect the safety of drinking water and agricultural production in the watershed. The environmental problems faced by the industry development are the important constraints that inhibit the sustainable development of the Chinese pao cai industry.

Health benefits 
Sichuan pao cai has abundant fibers, vitamins, minerals, and small amounts of carbohydrates, which can help to achieve the balance of dietary nutrition. Because of the rich lactic acid bacteria in Sichuan pao cai, bacteria that cause intestinal diseases can be inhibited, leading to the microbiological balance in the intestines. In some Sichuan areas, the Sichuan pao cai brine is used to treat diarrhea, colds, and other diseases. Moreover, some types of lactic acid bacteria in Sichuan pao cai may help with oral health by affecting the oral microbiome. Also, the lactic acid bacteria separated from Sichuan pao cai can be made into drugs, significantly reducing the fat accumulation and thus resisting fat livers.

Controversy between Sichuan pao cai and Korean kimchi 
In Chinese, kimchi is translated as "Korean pao cai" or "Korean pickles". The dispute between China and South Korea over the culture appropriation of pao cai, or kimchi is one of the soft power conflicts between the two counties. Sichuan pao cai, as one of the most representative pao cai in China, is in constant friction with Korean kimchi.

On 7 November 2013, the Korean government announced that the new Chinese translation of the term kimchi would be , which is a phono-semantic matching of Korean kimchi and can also mean "spicy and extraordinary". On 14 May 2014, since this term has still not become popular despite the promotion of the Korean government, the National Institute of the Korean Language announced that the translation would be reverted to "pao cai". On 22 July 2021, the Ministry of Culture, Sports and Tourism of Korea announced that the translation would once again be reverted to "xinqi".

Pao cai industry international standard by  International Organization for Standardization (ISO) 
On November 24, 2020, a global regulator issued an international standard for the pao cai industry which was developed under Chinese leadership and led by the Meishan Municipal Bureau of Market Supervision in Sichuan Province. The global regulator, the International Organization for Standardization (ISO), set standardized definitions of the “categories” and “requirements” of pao cai, with the objectives of facilitating the international trade and distribution of pao cai by developing unified and explicit product quality and safety guarantees for the industry.

The ISO standard used the name, pao cai, in Mandarin for these fermented vegetables that are popular in the western Chinese province of Sichuan, and explicitly excluded kimchi in its definition by stating "the document does not apply to kimchi".

See also

Kimchi - Korean pickled vegetable dish

References

Chinese pickles
Northeastern Chinese cuisine
Sichuan cuisine
Vegetable dishes
Vegetarian dishes of China